Lucie Satrapová (born 3 July 1989) is a Czech handball player for Paris 92 and the Czech national team.

She participated at the 2018 European Women's Handball Championship.

References

1989 births
Living people
Czech female handball players
Expatriate handball players
Czech expatriate sportspeople in France
Czech expatriate sportspeople in Germany
Czech expatriate sportspeople in Sweden
Sportspeople from Havlíčkův Brod